Leisenring can refer to:

Places
 Leisenring, Pennsylvania

People
John Leisenring (1853–1901), Republican member of the U.S. House of Representatives from Pennsylvania
Brady Leisenring (born 1982) American hockey player
Albert Leisenring Watson (1876–1960), American federal judge
James J. Leisenring, American accountant
Edward B. Leisenring, Jr. (1926–2011), president of the Westmoreland Coal Company 
Margaret Leisenring (1906–1926), who acted under the name Jean Stuart